Presbyterian Mission School, Diphu is a Christian co-educational institution, established in 2000, run by the Karbi Anglong Presbyterian Mission with the help of the Synod Mission Board of Mizoram, Presbyterian Church of India. It is an unaided School comprising Nursery to Secondary level. The school has branches in various parts of Karbi Anglong district, Assam, under the same name. Presbyterian Mission High School is a self-supporting Mission School. The institution is affiliated with the Board of Secondary Education, Assam (SEBA).

Method of teaching
The school use English as the medium of teaching. The school is aided by several missionaries and volunteer from the community. The missionaries devote their life to the school and social activism through educational liberation.

Activities
Morning devotion is conducted every other day, in which students are assigned to read one Bible verse and sing hymns.

Administrative
Headmasters who have served in the school:

Scholastic
4 Unit Test, Half-yearly and annual examination are conducted to evaluate students. Promotion is based on the overall performance in examinations.

Non-scholastic also co-scholastics
Students are assigned activities relevant to their gender, such as embroidery for girls, and bamboo works for boys. However, there are some activities that are unisex: clay modelling, book binding, and knitting.

See also
 Presbyterian Mission School, Hamren

References

Website : https://www.pmhsdiphu.com/

Christian schools in Assam
High schools and secondary schools in Assam
Karbi Anglong district
Educational institutions established in 2000
2000 establishments in Assam